Berlin im Aufbau is an East German documentary film directed by Kurt Maetzig, one of East Germany's most respected film-makers, between 1945 and 1946. It was a prominent 22 minute documentary, released in 1946 and produced by the DEFA film company. Maetzig was assisted in the assembly of the film by Marion Keller, who had also scripted and organized several other propaganda films of the late 1940s.

The film has historical significance in that it documents the first phase of the rebuilding of the destroyed city of Berlin after World War II and was one of three documentaries shot in the immediate aftermath examining the reconstruction of the city. The documentary explores the redevelopments in culture, transport, health care and education, industry and trade, compiled using newsreel footage of eyewitnesses. It also explores the marked social changes since the fall of Nazi Germany; in one scene a Jewish carpenter is helping a German man on a roof top reconstructing it.

The film is essentially a propaganda film, intended to raise the morale of the people after the devastation and showing promise to the nation in the redevelopment programme. However in making the film, like Joop Huisken, who was assigned to make a similar film of Potsdam entitled Potsdam baut auf, Maetzig was careful not to exaggerate the achievements and courage of the people, keeping it realistic. Like other similar "Aufbau" films, this one begins with a brief German history, and provides a narrative showing how the disordered past can be put back into order, and how through their diligent labor, the German people can be seen as productive members of a post-war society. The film also highlighted the acceptance of post-war perceptions of gender in that while females were typified as being wives and friends, they may also be accepted as equal partners in the workforce.

References

External links
 

1946 films
East German films
1940s German-language films
1946 documentary films
Black-and-white documentary films
German documentary films
Documentary films about Berlin
Films directed by Kurt Maetzig
World War II propaganda films
1930s German films
German propaganda films